Gürses may refer to:

People
 Müslüm Gürses, Turkish folk singer
 Sabri Gürses, Turkish writer
 Uğur Gürses, Turkish financial columnist

Places
 Gürses, Çınar, a village in Diyarbakır Province, Turkey
 Gürses, Demre, a village in Antalya Province, Turkey

Turkish-language surnames